Directive-type Memorandum-19-004, "Military Service by Transgender Persons and Persons with Gender Dysphoria", was a memorandum issued by the United States Department of Defense (DoD) prohibiting most transgender individuals from serving or enlisting in the United States Armed Forces and the DoD. The DTM took effect on April 12, 2019 under the presidency of Donald Trump, signed by David Norquist. Originally scheduled to expire on March 12, 2020, it was extended until September 12, 2020. Before it expired, it was replaced by Department of Defense Instruction 1300.28, which took effect on September 4, 2020, signed by Matthew Donovan.

The memorandum banned new applicants who have any history of medical transition treatment. Applicants with a history of gender dysphoria were presumptively disqualified unless they have been deemed "stable" after 36 months and willing to detransition to their assigned sex.

The memorandum drew significant controversy from politicians, former military officials, the transgender rights movement, and other commentators. Several National Guards refused to enforce the ban. The memorandum was a topic in the 2020 United States presidential election.

After Joe Biden was elected and sworn in, one of his first executive orders was the repeal of the Presidential Memorandum on Military Service by Transgender Individuals. On January 25, 2021, Biden signed an executive order that required the DoD to reverse the memorandum, permitting transgender people from serving in the U.S. military.

History

On October 3, 2016, Donald Trump called transgender individuals serving the United States military "politically correct", but said he would leave such decisions to top military leaders. On May 16, 2017, a letter was signed by several right-leaning groups pushed for banning transgender individuals from the U.S. military. After the failure of passage of House Amendment 183, an amendment to prohibit the DoD from funding gender reassignment surgeries sponsored by Vicky Hartzler, to the National Defense Authorization Act for Fiscal Year 2018, House Republicans went to Defense Secretary James Mattis to make the prohibition, but he refused. An extensive DoD review of the policy was already underway, but a decision was not expected for months. House Republicans then went to the White House to make the prohibition. Chief strategist Steve Bannon encouraged Trump to deal with the matter now and played a role in pushing Trump to move ahead with banning transgender people from the military, despite the ongoing DoD review.

In July 2017, the Freedom Caucus threatened not to vote for the budget unless President Trump instituted some prohibition on paying for gender reassignment surgeries and hormone treatments for transgender people serving in the military. The interagency process had gone to work on the question, and the general counsels of the departments and agencies had weighed in. The Deputies Committee had met, and there were several Principals Committee meetings. There was no agreement, but four options were developed:

 Retain the Obama-era policy
 Give Secretary Jim Mattis leeway
 Ban transgender people from the military, but come up with a plan for transgender people currently serving
 Ban all transgender people from the military

On July 26, 2017, President Trump tweeted that he would ban transgender personnel in the United States military. According to Politico, President Trump had always planned to ban transgender individuals from the military and prohibit the DoD from funding gender reassignment surgeries. Per several congressional and White House sources, the tweet was a last-ditch attempt to save a House proposal that was a priority for Trump and was on the verge of defeat.

On August 4, 2017, a guidance called "A Guidance Policy for Open Transgender Service Phase Out" was approved by the White House Counsel's office. The guidance encourages early retirement, push out any enlisted personnel after their contract expired, and fire transgender officers who are up for promotion. The new policy did allow transgender service members to continue serving, but offered no protection from harassment or other efforts to get them to quit, along with prohibiting coverage of transitioning or other medical costs. The guidance was expected to be transmitted to the DoD the week of August 7, 2017, but tensions with North Korea, internal conflict within the White House, and pushback from the military prompted the authors of the policy to revise it again.

Provisions
 Describes transgender military service as "special accommodations"
 No person, solely on the basis of his or her gender identity, will be denied accession, involuntarily separated or discharged, denied reenlistment or continuation of service, or subjected to adverse action or mistreatment within the United States military
 Transgender service members or applicants for accession to the United States military are subject to the same standards as cisgendered people
 When a standard, requirement, or policy depends on whether the individual is a male or a female ( e.g., medical fitness for duty; physical fitness and body fat standards; berthing, bathroom, and shower facilities; and uniform and grooming standards), all persons will be subject to the standard, requirement, or policy associated with their biological sex
 A history or diagnosis of gender dysphoria is disqualifying unless:
 As certified by a licensed mental health provider, the applicant demonstrates 36 consecutive months of stability in the applicant's biological sex immediately preceding submission of the application without clinically significant distress or impairment in social, occupational, or other important areas of functioning; and
 The applicant demonstrates that the applicant has not transitioned to his or her preferred gender and a licensed medical provider has determined that gender transition is not medically necessary to protect the health of the individual; and
 The applicant is willing and able to adhere to all applicable standards
A history of cross-sex hormone therapy or a history of sex reassignment or genital reconstruction surgery is disqualifying
 The accession standards will be reviewed and either maintained or changed no later than 24 months from the effective date of this DTM
 May consult with a military medical provider, receive a diagnosis of gender dysphoria, and receive mental health counseling, but may not obtain a gender marker change in DEERS or serve in their preferred gender
 The United States Department of Defense and the United States Coast Guard provide equal opportunity to all Service members, in an environment free from harassment and discrimination on the basis of race, color, national origin, religion, sex, gender identity, or sexual orientation
 Separation processing will not be initiated until the enlisted Service member has been formally counseled on his or her failure to adhere to such standards and has been given an opportunity to correct those deficiencies, or has been formally counseled that his or her indication that he or she is unable or unwilling to adhere to such standards may lead to processing for administrative separation and has been given an opportunity to correct those deficiencies
 Separation processing will not be initiated until the enlisted Service member has been counseled in writing that the condition does not qualify as a disability"

Exempt individuals

 Individuals are exempt from the ban if they had before the effective date of this DTM:
 Entered into a contract for enlistment into the Military Services using DD Form 4, "Enlistment/Reenlistment Document Armed Forces of the United States", available on the DoD Forms Management Program website at DoD Forms Management, or an equivalent, or were selected for entrance into an officer commissioning program through a selection board or similar process; and
 Either:
 Were medically qualified for Military Service or selected for entrance into an officer commissioning program in their preferred gender in accordance with DTM-16-005; or
  As a Service member, received a diagnosis of gender dysphoria from, or had such diagnosis confirmed, by a military medical provider

Waivers

 The Secretaries of Military Departments and the Commandant of the United States Coast Guard my grant full or partial waivers on a case by case individual basis for transgender individuals who are not exempt pursuant to this policy
 Delegating waiver authority may not be delegated lower than the Military Service Personnel Chiefs for the Secretaries of Military Departments and the Assistant Commandant for Human Resources for the Commandant of the United States Coast Guard.

Waivers are granted separately for gender dysphoria, to serve as one's preferred gender, and to receive maintenance hormone therapy.  There is ambiguity as to the consequences of a denial of the waiver.

On May 14, 2020, for the first time the United States Navy granted a wavier to an anonymous Naval officer, who was facing involuntary discharge serve, to serve in their preferred gender, to include obtaining a gender marker change in (the Defense Enrollment Eligibility Reporting System) and being allowed to adhere to standards associated with their preferred gender, such as uniforms and grooming.

Comparison table

Enforcement
As of August 7, 2019, according to the Washington Blade, the United States Army, United States Navy, United States Air Force, United States Marine Corps, and United States Coast Guard had engaged in no discharges under DTM-19-004. However, the Coast Guard reported denying enlistment to two applicants under DTM-19-004.

The National Guards of California, Colorado, Massachusetts, Nevada, New Jersey, New Mexico, Oregon, and Washington refused to enforce the transgender ban.

The Navy did not prohibit transgender personnel from expressing their identity off-duty and did not place gender restrictions on their clothing. However, regional commanders and the senior officers present could suspend or restrict the privilege of wearing preferred gender civilian attire to meet local conditions and host-nation agreements with foreign countries.

The United States Naval Academy planned to ban transgender people from attending the school in fall 2020.

Retention bills

Reactions
The memorandum had widespread support among Republicans. The Republican National Committee endorsed the trans ban from the military. Representative Ken Calvert of California called for the exclusion of trans soldiers due to "deployability" problems. Calvert stated, "Individuals with medical conditions that do not allow them to deploy, such as those identified in the policy, adversely impact military readiness and reduce the military's warfighting capability." However, some of Trump's supporters expressed their opposition to the ban, including Christopher R. Barron.

In August 2017, 56 retired generals and admirals signed on to a statement opposing the ban. Among them were General John R. Allen, General Robert W. Sennewald, and Vice Admiral Donald Arthur. The statement said in part: "[T]he proposed ban would degrade readiness even more than the failed 'don't ask, don't tell' policy. Patriotic transgender Americans who are serving — and who want to serve — must not be dismissed, deprived of medically necessary health care, or forced to compromise their integrity or hide their identity."

Laverne Cox said, "This administration's ban on transgender service members will go into effect this Friday April 12, 2019. They have targeted trans people from the moment they took power."

The American Medical Association told the Associated Press in April 2019 that the memorandum mischaracterized transgender people as having a "deficiency".

Kirsten Gillibrand condemned Trump for the directive, saying, "A man who has never served has told men and women that their service is not worthy, based on their gender identity. I can't think of a more discriminatory, outrageous statement." Another Democratic politician, Steve Bullock, the governor of Montana, announced he would allow transgender Americans to serve in the military. Elizabeth Warren pledged to overturn military transgender ban on the first day of her presidency.

On March 18, 2019, Democratic 2020 nominee Cory Booker vowed to reverse Donald Trump's ban on transgender individuals serving in the military if elected.

During his 2020 presidential campaign, Mike Bloomberg pledged to reverse the ban on transgender individuals in the military.

In September 2020, Democratic nominee Joe Biden promised he would reverse the ban. When asked about "the rights of transgender people, banning them from military service" in a televised townhall on October 15, 2020, Biden replied, "I would just flat-out change the law. I would eliminated [Trump's] executive orders, number one."

Lawsuits 
Four lawsuits challenging Directive-type Memorandum-19-004 yielded no judicial remedies:

Jane Doe v. Trump
Stone v. Trump
Karnoski v. Trump
Stockman v. Trump

The decision by the Supreme Court to stay preliminary injunctions in the cases Karnoski v. Trump and Stockman v. Trump suggested the justices would likely uphold the ban in a ruling.

House Resolution 
On March 28, 2019, the House of Representatives passed  with 238 yeas, 185 nays, 1 present, and 8 not voting. The resolution was a non-binding resolution expressing opposition to banning service in the Armed Forces by openly transgender individuals.

Opinion polling

Repeal and inclusion
On January 25, 2021, U.S. President Joe Biden signed Executive Order 14004, which ended the transgender military ban. Despite immediately revoking the 2017 and 2018 presidential memorandums which aided the instruction, the DoD is not required to repeal the Instruction until after holding consultation with the Joint Chiefs of Staff. The DoD announced gender inclusion at the end of March 2021.

See also
 Transgender personnel in the United States military
 Transgender inequality

References

External links
 DOD INSTRUCTION 1300.28
 Directive-type Memorandum (DTM)-19-004
 MARADMINS Number: 220/19 
 NAVADMIN 070/19  
 United States Coast Guard transgender policy

2010s in LGBT history
2019 in American law
2019 in military history
Trump administration controversies
Discrimination against LGBT people in the United States
Employment discrimination
LGBT rights in the United States
United States federal defense and national security legislation
United States military law
Transgender people and the United States military
Discrimination against transgender people
Transgender law in the United States
Executive orders of Joe Biden